Henry Johnston (26 September 1919 – 12 October 1973) was an English footballer. He was the Football Writers' Association Footballer of the Year in 1951. He spent his entire professional playing career with Blackpool, with whom he appeared in three FA Cup Finals, winning one. During his career, he appeared in all three half-back positions, and even moved up to centre forward when needed.

Club career
Blackpool signed Manchester-born Johnston as a 15-year-old apprentice. Three years later, on 20 November 1937, he made his debut in a 2–0 defeat to arch-rivals Preston North End at Deepdale. Despite the result, Johnston was named Man of the Match. For the final game of the season, at home to West Bromwich Albion, he was moved to the forward line. He responded by scoring Blackpool's third goal in their 3–1 victory. By the following season, he was a regular in the Seasiders' team.

After the war, during which he served in the Middle East, Johnston became the foundation on which the Blackpool team was built. As captain, he led them to FA Cup Final appearances in 1948, 1951, and the most famous final of all in 1953, when he became the first and, thus far, only Blackpool skipper to lift the trophy. He made 40 appearances and scored three goals in the competition in his career.

In 1951, Johnston was voted FWA Footballer of the Year. He was the subject of bids from other big clubs, but he always remained a one-club player.

He played his last game on 25 April 1955, at Newcastle United. At that point he had made more appearances for Blackpool than any other player; a record later broken by Jimmy Armfield.

Blackpool F.C. Hall of Fame
Johnston was inducted into the Hall of Fame at Bloomfield Road, when it was officially opened by former Blackpool player Jimmy Armfield in April 2006. Organised by the Blackpool Supporters Association, Blackpool fans around the world voted on their all-time heroes. Five players from each decade are inducted; Johnston is in the 1950s.

International career
For a man of his stature, his international career was very short, with only ten appearances for England in a seven-year span. His appearances were limited due to the consistent performances of Billy Wright.

Johnston made his England debut on 27 November 1946, in an 8–2 friendly victory over the Netherlands at Leeds Road. His tenth and final international appearance occurred on 25 November 1953, in the 6–3 defeat by Hungary at Wembley.

Post-retirement
In late 1955 Johnston became manager of Reading, with whom he spent seven seasons. He returned to Bloomfield Road in 1967 as assistant manager to Stan Mortensen, and when Morty was sacked late in the 1968–69 campaign, he took over as caretaker manager. In February 1970, he became assistant secretary, a role that meant he was in charge of the ticket office and editing the club's programme.

When he died in his hometown of Manchester in 1973 at age 54, "the whole town of Blackpool mourned, for Harry Johnston was one of the greatest players ever to wear the tangerine shirt."

Career statistics

Club statistics

International statistics

Managerial statistics

Honours
Blackpool
FA Cup: 1952–53
FA Cup runner-up: 1947–48, 1950–51
Lancashire FA Cup: 1953–54

England
British Home Championship: 1946–47, 1953–54

Individual
FWA Footballer of the Year: 1951

See also
One-club man

References

Further reading

External links
Independent site profile
EnglandStats.com
Johnston in the Blackpool Supporters Association Hall of Fame

1919 births
1973 deaths
Military personnel from Manchester
Blackpool F.C. players
Droylsden F.C. players
England international footballers
English footballers
Association football defenders
Footballers from Manchester
Reading F.C. managers
Blackpool F.C. managers
English Football League players
English football managers
English Football League representative players
FA Cup Final players
British military personnel of World War II